Damar Romeyelle Hamlin (born March 24, 1998) is an American football safety for the Buffalo Bills of the National Football League (NFL). He played college football at the University of Pittsburgh and was selected by the Bills in the sixth round of the 2021 NFL Draft. Hamlin spent most of his rookie season as a backup before becoming a starter in 2022 following a season-ending injury to Micah Hyde.

During a Monday Night Football game on January 2, 2023, Hamlin suffered cardiac arrest after making a tackle. Cardiopulmonary resuscitation (CPR) and automated external defibrillation (AED) were quickly administered before he was rushed to a local hospital in critical condition. After showing notable signs of improvement Hamlin was transferred to a Buffalo hospital, and nine days after the incident he was discharged to rehabilitate from home.

Early life and education 

Hamlin was raised in McKees Rocks, Pennsylvania. He attended Central Catholic High School in Pittsburgh, Pennsylvania. He was named first-team All-State and the Class AAAA Defensive Player of the Year.

College career 
Hamlin was considered a top cornerback coming out of Central Catholic High School. He was a four-star recruit and was pursued by major college football programs including Pittsburgh, Penn State, Ohio State and Temple. He selected the Pittsburgh Panthers and played in three games as a freshman before suffering an injury and receiving a medical redshirt exception for that year.

As a redshirt freshman playing in his second year, Hamlin was not back to full health until week three of the football season. Playing the safety position, he recorded 41 tackles with one interception in nine games played. The next year, Hamlin led the Panthers "sniper gang" secondary with 77 tackles and two interceptions as a redshirt sophomore and was named honorable mention All-Atlantic Coast Conference (ACC). He would register 84 tackles with 10 passes broken up as a redshirt junior.

Going into his final season, Hamlin was a team captain and was named to the All-ACC second-team after leading the Panthers with 66 tackles and seven passes broken up. He earned ACC Co-Defensive Back of the Week honors for his November 21, 2020 game against Virginia Tech.

Hamlin earned a bachelor's degree in communication from the University of Pittsburgh.

College statistics

Professional career 

The Buffalo Bills selected Hamlin in the sixth round with the 212th overall pick of the 2021 NFL Draft. He signed his four-year rookie contract with Buffalo on May 21, 2021. After playing a reserve role his first season, Hamlin became one of Buffalo's starting safeties in 2022 after Micah Hyde suffered a season-ending neck injury in Week 2. Against the New York Jets in Week 9, Hamlin led the team with 12 tackles and a sack in the 2017 loss. In Week 13 against the New England Patriots, Hamlin was ejected after an illegal hit on Jakobi Meyers in the 2410 win. He was placed on injured reserve on January 6, 2023, after his in-game collapse against the Cincinnati Bengals.

In-game collapse 

On January 2, 2023, during a Week 17 Monday Night Football game against the Cincinnati Bengals, Hamlin collapsed on the field at 8:56 p.m. EST after tackling wide receiver Tee Higgins and required immediate emergency medical treatment.

At the start of the play, Higgins caught a pass by Joe Burrow near the 50-yard line and ran downfield while leading with his right shoulder, which collided against Hamlin's chest. As the defender, Hamlin made a tackle by wrapping his arms around Higgins' shoulders and helmet to bring him down to the ground. Sports commentators described the tackle as seemingly routine while noting the jarring nature of the contact. Following the play, Hamlin stood up momentarily before passing out and falling backwards.

Hamlin remained motionless at midfield while team trainers and paramedics rushed to his side within ten seconds. First responders initiated CPR, automated external defibrillation (AED) and other treatments to Hamlin on the field for ten minutes. Hamlin was eventually administered oxygen and an intravenous solution (IV). An ambulance was brought onto the field about four minutes after his collapse for more assistance. As he was being placed on a stretcher, most of the players from both teams came off the sidelines to kneel or stand on the field near him in prayer, visibly upset and emotional about his status.

After being transported by ambulance to the University of Cincinnati Medical Center at 9:23 p.m. EST, he was reported to be in critical condition and was intubated. Later that night at 1:48 a.m. local time, the Bills reported that Hamlin had initially suffered cardiac arrest and his heartbeat was restored on-field.

Initial reports, made by several news organizations citing medical professionals, stated that the hit to his chest likely caused commotio cordis, but no official confirmation has been provided as to the cause of the cardiac arrest. When asked by Michael Strahan, on Good Morning America, what caused the cardiac arrest, Hamlin said, "Um, that's something I want to stay away from."

Game status 

After Hamlin was removed from the field, it was reported separately by ESPN and Westwood One that play would resume and teams would be given a warmup period for five minutes. However, the game remained suspended and the NFL later denied the reports it planned to compel the teams to finish the game that evening. Per the NFL's emergency-situation rules, the game was suspended at roughly 9:16 p.m. with 5:58 remaining in the first quarter. The game was ultimately postponed for the night shortly after 10 p.m., just over one hour after Hamlin collapsed with attendees and personnel departing the stadium.

The following day, the NFL announced that the game would not be resumed that week, and that it had not yet made a decision on rescheduling. On January 5, the NFL announced that the game would be canceled entirely, saying it was "difficult, but necessary" under the "extraordinary circumstances". Addressing the implications for team standings and playoffs, it said "not playing the Buffalo-Cincinnati game to its conclusion will have no effect on which clubs qualify for the postseason. No club would qualify for the postseason and no club will be eliminated based on the outcome of this game."

Recovery 

On January 3, Hamlin remained at the University of Cincinnati Academic Health Center while sedated and on a ventilator. According to his uncle Dorrian Glen, Hamlin was placed on his stomach to help take the pressure off his lungs. He also stated that Hamlin's condition was "trending upwards."

On January 5, Bills cornerback Kaiir Elam said that Hamlin was awake and doing better. The same day, the Bills released a statement saying, "Damar has shown remarkable improvement over the past 24 hours" and "while still critically ill, he has demonstrated that he appears to be neurologically intact. His lungs continue to heal and he is making steady progress."

Trauma surgeon Dr. Timothy Pritts said Hamlin was able to communicate by writing on paper or by nodding and shaking his head because he still has a breathing tube. When Hamlin woke up, he was able to follow commands, had full control and feeling in his extremities, and asked who won Monday night's football game by communicating in writing on a clipboard. "When he asked, 'Did we win?' the answer is, 'Yes, Damar, you won. You won the game of life, said Pritts. The doctor said significant progress is still needed, but "this marks a really good turning point in his ongoing care."

On January 6, Hamlin was able to breathe on his own, at which point his breathing tube was removed, allowing him to speak. Later that day, he made a brief video call by FaceTime to a Bills team meeting.

On January 7, Hamlin made his first public comments since his cardiac arrest through social media, stating that he was thankful for the love he has received and asked for continued prayers for a "long road" ahead.

On January 9, a week after being admitted to the hospital, Hamlin was discharged from the University of Cincinnati Medical Center so he could return to Buffalo and continue treatment there. He was flown to Buffalo General Medical Center in stable condition, with tests done the following day to determine if he could be released. Hamlin said via his Twitter account that he was "Not home quite just yet" and "Still doing & passing a bunch of tests."

Nine days after the incident, on January 11, he was discharged from Buffalo General Medical Center/Gates Vascular Institute, to continue his rehabilitation at home.

A spokesman for the family reported that Hamlin's heart was being monitored and that he was still using additional oxygen. Hamlin was able to attend the Bills' Divisional round game against the Bengals as a spectator. This marked Hamlin's first public appearance since the collapse.

In February 2023, Hamlin made a special on-field appearance at Super Bowl LVII, accompanied by Bills athletic training and medical staff and UC Health staff members.

Reactions 

Following the collapse, numerous NFL players and teams quickly offered their support and prayers on social media. The following day, all 32 NFL teams changed their profile pictures on Twitter to a picture of Hamlin's jersey and text that reads "Pray For Damar." Tee Higgins offered his condolences to Hamlin's family, as did Cincinnati Bengals wide receiver Ja'Marr Chase. Buffalo Bills quarterback Josh Allen urged people "Please pray for our brother."

Fans began gathering outside the University of Cincinnati Academic Health Center following his collapse. Hours after the incident, the lights on Paycor Stadium, the location of the game, were lit blue in honor of Hamlin along with the lights on Fifth Third Bank's headquarters on Fountain Square. Niagara Falls was illuminated in blue on the evening of January 3 in support of Hamlin.

Shortly after the incident, there was an increase in rhetoric and disinformation from well-known anti-vaxxers making unfounded claims about Hamlin's cardiac arrest and COVID-19 vaccines.

Charitable donations 

In the hours following his collapse, Hamlin's 2020 GoFundMe campaign for the Chasing M's Foundation toy drive received a massive influx of donations from fans and others. Many of the donations had messages of support for Hamlin. In the days that followed, dozens of NFL players, coaches, and executives donated to the campaign, which grew from its $2,500 goal amount to over $8.7million . Chasing M's Foundation later updated their GoFundMe message saying the "fundraiser was initially established to support a toy drive for Damar’s community," but was "hopeful about Damar's future involvement in disbursing the incredibly generous contributions." On January 12, The Buffalo News had a detailed story covering the enormous changes facing Chasing M's structure and operations in light of the large donations, including its tax-exempt status and governance.

NFL career statistics

Regular season

Postseason

Personal life 

In addition to his football career, Hamlin is a fashion entrepreneur, having started a fashion line, Chasing Millions, while at the University of Pittsburgh.

In 2020, Hamlin started organizing annual charity Christmas toy drives in his hometown of McKees Rocks, Pennsylvania. The GoFundMe campaign for his 2020 toy drive had set a goal of $2,500.

Shortly after his in-game medical emergency in January 2023, the donation drive received a spike in donations. Hamlin's social media garnered over a million followers in the ensuing days.

References

External links

 Pittsburgh Panthers bio
 Buffalo Bills bio

1998 births
Living people
20th-century African-American people
21st-century African-American sportspeople
African-American players of American football
American football safeties
Buffalo Bills players
Central Catholic High School (Pittsburgh) alumni
People from McKees Rocks, Pennsylvania
Pittsburgh Panthers football players
Players of American football from Pennsylvania
Sportspeople from the Pittsburgh metropolitan area